Gandala could refer to one of the following places in India:
 Gandala, Rajasthan
 Gandala, Odisha